Dave Keenan (born 1951) is a Canadian former politician, who served in the Legislative Assembly of Yukon from 1996 to 2002. He represented the electoral district of Ross River-Southern Lakes as a member of the Yukon New Democratic Party, and served in the cabinet of Piers McDonald as Minister of Community and Transportation Services.

Prior to his election to the legislature, Keenan served as chief of the Teslin Tlingit Council from 1988 to 1996.

References

1951 births
Living people
20th-century First Nations people
21st-century First Nations people
First Nations politicians
Indigenous leaders in Yukon
Tlingit people
Yukon New Democratic Party MLAs